Enterprise Rupes is an escarpment on Mercury, located at 36.54°S, 283.46°W. It is the longest rupes on Mercury, with a length of . The escarpment was named after , a ship which conducted the first surveys of the Mississippi and Amazon rivers.

References 

Scarps on Mercury